The Commissioners in Lunacy or Lunacy Commission were a public body established by the Lunacy Act 1845 to oversee asylums and the welfare of mentally ill people in England and Wales. It succeeded the Metropolitan Commissioners in Lunacy.

Previous bodies
The predecessors of the Commissioners in Lunacy were the Metropolitan Commissioners in Lunacy, dating back to the Madhouses Act 1774, and established as such by the Madhouses Act 1828.  By 1842 their remit had been extended from London to cover the whole country.  The Lord Chancellor's jurisdiction over lunatics so found by writ of De Lunatico Inquirendo had been delegated to two Masters-in-Chancery.  By the Lunacy Act 1842 (5&6 Vict. c.64), these were established as the Commissioners in Lunacy and after 1845 they were retitled Masters in Lunacy.

Establishment
Anthony Ashley-Cooper, Seventh Earl of Shaftesbury was the head of the Commission from its founding in 1845 until his death in 1885. The Lunacy Commission was made up of eleven Metropolitan Commissioners: three medical, three legal and five laymen. The Commission was monumental as it was not only a full-time commission, but it was also salaried for six of its members. The six members of the commission who were full-time and salaried were the three members of the legal system and the three members of the medical community. The other five lay members of the commission were all honorary members who simply had to attend board meetings. The duty of the Commission was to carry out the provisions of the Act, reporting to the Poor Law Commissioners (in the case of workhouses) and to the Lord Chancellor. The first Secretary to the Commissioners was Robert Wilfred Skeffington Lutwidge, a barrister and uncle of Lewis Carroll. He had previously been one of the Metropolitan Commissioners, and later become an Inspector of the Commission. A Master in Lunacy ranked next after a Master in Chancery in the order of precedence.

Asylums commissioned
The following asylums were commissioned under the auspices of the Commissioners in Lunacy (or their predecessors):

English county asylums
First Bedford County Asylum (Bedford), 1812
Second Bedfordshire County Asylum (Fairfield), 1860
Berkshire County Asylum (Moulsford), 1870
Buckinghamshire County Asylum (Stone), 1853
Cambridgeshire County Asylum (Fulbourn), 1858
First Cheshire County Asylum (Chester), 1829
Second Cheshire County Asylum (Macclesfield), 1871
Cornwall County Asylum (Bodmin), 1818
Cumberland and Westmorland County Asylum (Carleton), 1862
Derbyshire County Asylum (Mickleover), 1851
Devon County Asylum (Exminster), 1845
Dorset County Asylum (Charminster), 1863
Durham County Asylum (Sedgefield), 1858
East Riding County Asylum (Walkington), 1871
East Sussex County Asylum (Hellingly), 1898
First Essex County Asylum (Brentwood), 1853
Second Essex County Asylum (Colchester), 1913
First Gloucestershire County Asylum (Gloucester), 1823
Second Gloucestershire County Asylum (Gloucester), 1883
First Hampshire County Asylum (Knowle), 1852
Second Hampshire County Asylum (Basingstoke), 1917
Herefordshire County Asylum (Burghill), 1868
Hertfordshire County Asylum (St Albans), 1899
Isle of Wight County Asylum (Gatcombe), 1896
First Kent County Asylum (Barming Heath), 1833
Second Kent County Asylum (Chartham), 1875
Kesteven County Asylum (Quarrington, 1897
First Lancashire County Asylum (Lancaster), 1816
Second Lancashire County Asylum (Prestwich), 1851
Third Lancashire County Asylum (Rainhill), 1851
Fourth Lancashire County Asylum (Whittingham), 1873
Fifth Lancashire County Asylum (Winwick), 1897
Sixth Lancashire County Asylum (Whalley), 1915
Leicestershire County Asylum (Leicester), 1837
Lincolnshire County Asylum (Bracebridge Heath), 1852
First London County Asylum (Hanwell), 1831
Second London County Asylum (Colney Hatch), 1849
Third London County Asylum (Belmont), 1877
Fourth London County Asylum (Coulsdon), 1882
Fifth London County Asylum (Woodford Bridge), 1893
Sixth London County Asylum (Epsom), 1899
Seventh London County Asylum (Dartford Heath), 1898
Eighth London County Asylum (Epsom), 1902
Ninth London County Asylum (Epsom), 1904
Tenth London County Asylum (Epsom), 1907
Eleventh London County Asylum (Epsom), 1921
Norfolk County Asylum (Norwich), 1814
Northamptonshire County Asylum (Duston), 1876
Northumberland County Asylum (Morpeth), 1859
North Riding County Asylum (Clifton), 1847
First Nottinghamshire County Asylum (Sneinton), 1812
Second Nottinghamshire County Asylum (Radcliffe-on-Trent), 1902
Oxfordshire County Asylum (Littlemore), 1846
Shropshire County Asylum (Shelton), 1845
First Somerset County Asylum (Horrington), 1848
Second Somerset County Asylum (Norton Fitzwarren), 1897
First Staffordshire County Asylum (Stafford), 1818
Second Staffordshire County Asylum (Cheddleton), 1892
Suffolk County Asylum (Melton), 1827
First Surrey County Asylum (Tooting), 1840
Second Surrey County Asylum (Woking), 1867
Third Surrey County Asylum (Hooley), 1905
Sussex County Asylum (Haywards Heath), 1859
Warwickshire County Asylum (Hatton), 1852
First West Riding County Asylum (Wakefield), 1818
Second West Riding County Asylum (Middlewood), 1872
Third West Riding County Asylum (Menston), 1885
Fourth West Riding County Asylum (Storthes Hall), 1904
Fifth West Riding County Asylum (Burley in Wharfedale), 1902
West Sussex County Asylum (Chichester), 1894
Wiltshire County Asylum (Devizes), 1849
First Worcestershire County Asylum (Powick), 1847
Second Worcestershire County Asylum (Bromsgrove), 1907

"New" mental hospitals established later by Middlesex County Council
Note: The First Surrey County Asylum at Tooting (see above) was transferred to Middlesex County Council in 1888 and became the First Middlesex County Mental Hospital in the early 20th century
Second Middlesex County Mental Hospital (London Colney), 1905
Third Middlesex County Mental Hospital (Shenley), 1934

English borough asylums
Croydon Borough Asylum, 1903
First Birmingham City Asylum, 1850
Second Birmingham City Asylum, 1882
Third Birmingham City Asylum, 1905
Bristol City Asylum, 1861
Canterbury Borough Asylum, 1902
Derby Borough Asylum, 1888
East Ham Borough Asylum, 1937
Exeter City Asylum, 1886
Gateshead Borough Asylum, 1914
Ipswich Borough Asylum, 1870
Kingston upon Hull Borough Asylum, 1883
Leicester Borough Asylum, 1869
Lincoln Borough Asylum, 1817
Middlesbrough Borough Asylum, 1898
Newcastle upon Tyne Borough Asylum, 1869
City of London Asylum, 1866
Norwich Borough Asylum, 1828
Nottingham Borough Asylum, 1880
Plymouth Borough Asylum, 1891
Portsmouth Borough Asylum, 1879
Sunderland Borough Asylum, 1895
West Ham Borough Asylum, 1901
York Borough Asylum, 1906

Metropolitan Asylums Board asylums (established for chronic cases)
Caterham Asylum, 1870
Darenth Asylum, 1878
Leavesden Asylum, 1870
Tooting Bec Asylum, 1903

Welsh county asylums
Brecon and Radnor County Asylum (Talgarth), 1903
Carmarthenshire, Cardigan and Pembrokeshire County Asylum (Carmarthen), 1865
Denbighshire County Asylum (Denbigh), 1844
First Glamorgan County Asylum (Pen-y-fai), 1864
Second Glamorgan County Asylum (Bridgend), 1886
Monmouthshire County Asylum (Abergavenny), 1851

Welsh borough asylums
Cardiff City Asylum, 1908
Newport Borough Asylum, 1906
Swansea Borough Mental Hospital, 1932

Successors
The Mental Deficiency Act 1913 replaced the Commission with the Board of Control for Lunacy and Mental Deficiency.

Commissioners
Incomplete list:
Thomas Turner, Medical (1845–1854)
Henry Herbert Southey, Medical (1845–1848)
Bryan Procter, Legal (1845–1860)
Anthony Ashley-Cooper, 7th Earl of Shaftesbury, Lay, chair (1845–1885)
Robert Vernon, 1st Baron Lyveden, Lay (1845–1860)
Edward Seymour, 12th Duke of Somerset, Lay (1845–1852)
Robert Gordon, Lay (1845)
Francis Barlow, Lay (1845)
J. R. Southey, Medical (1845)
James Cowles Prichard (1845–1848), Medical, in place of Southey who resigned
James Mylne, Legal (1845)
John Hancock Hall (1845)
Robert Wilfred Skeffington Lutwidge (appointed 1855)
Harry Davenport (appointed 1889)
Edward Nugent, Earl of Milltown (appointed 1889)
Henry Morgan-Clifford
Sir Marriott Cooke (1898–1914)

See also
 Alleged Lunatics' Friend Society
 Psychiatric survivors movement
 Commissioners in Lunacy for Scotland
 Commissioners in Lunacy for Ireland

Footnotes

References

External links
Web pages by Andrew Roberts at Middlesex University:
The Lunacy Commission
Charts of the Commissioners

Mental health legal history of the United Kingdom
Defunct public bodies of the United Kingdom